The Stranger Wore a Gun is a 1953 American Western film directed by Andre DeToth and starring Randolph Scott and Claire Trevor. Based on the short story "Yankee Gold" by John W. Cunningham, the film is about a war criminal wanted for the slaughter of women and children who moves to Arizona to join a gold robbery but reconsiders and decides to change his life. The film is one of the first 3-D western movies; it earned an estimated $1.6 million at the North American box office in 1953. The supporting cast includes Joan Weldon, George Macready, Alfonso Bedoya, Lee Marvin, and Ernest Borgnine.

Plot
Jeff Travis, a spy for Quantrill's Raiders, leaves when he realizes Quantrill's true nature. He enlists in the Confederate Army as a legitimate soldier. After the war, he narrowly escapes a gang looking for Quantrill's war criminals by jumping off a river boat, thanks to Josie's warning. He rides to Prescott, Arizona to start a new life again.

Crooked saloon owner Jules Mouret hires Jeff to monitor a series of gold shipments on the local stage line run by Jason Conroy and his daughter Shelby in preparation for a major robbery. Aided by henchmen Dan Kurth and Bull Slager, Jules runs his competitor, the Mexican bandit Degas, out of town. There is a hint of a possible romance between Jeff and Shelby, but nothing materializes once Josie, a well-known saddletramp and gambler, arrives and sets up shop in Jules’ saloon.

After the stage driver Jim is gunned down in a stage robbery, Jeff turns honest again and vows to avenge Jim. While waiting to rob the stage, Jules and his gang encounter Degas and his gang. Jules shoots Degas and tries to rob the stage but is stopped when Jeff kicks Dan off and returns to town. That night Jeff and Dan face off ready to draw but Jeff is faster. The next morning in the saloon Jeff faces off with Jules and Bull in the saloon. Bull tries to sneak his gun out but Josie yells and throws a lamp setting the saloon on fire. Bull keeps trying to shoot Jeff but Josie pulls his gun hand down allowing Jeff to shoot him and Josie escapes. Jeff goes after Jules but the fire is too much, trapping Jules. Jeff makes it out with only minor burns on his hands. Later that day Jeff and Josie board the stage for California to begin a new life again. Shelby and her father bid them goodbye.

Cast
Randolph Scott as Jeff Travis aka Mark Stone
Claire Trevor as Josie Sullivan
Joan Weldon as Shelby Conroy
George Macready as Jules Mourret
Alfonso Bedoya as Degas
Lee Marvin as Dan Kurth
Ernest Borgnine as Bull Slager
Pierre Watkin as Jason Conroy
Joseph Vitale as Shorty
Clem Bevans as Jim Martin

References

External links

1953 3D films
1953 films
1953 Western (genre) films
American Western (genre) films
Films based on short fiction
Films directed by Andre DeToth
Films set in Arizona
Films shot in Lone Pine, California
Columbia Pictures films
1950s English-language films
1950s American films